Aphonopelma anitahoffmannae is a species of spider in the family Theraphosidae, found in Mexico.

References

anitahoffmannae
Spiders described in 2005
Endemic spiders of Mexico